Kaarster Bahnhof (formerly Kaarst railway station) is a railway station in the town of Kaarst, North Rhine-Westphalia, Germany. The station lies on the Neuss–Viersen railway and the train services are operated by Regiobahn.

Train services
The station is served by the following services:

Rhine-Ruhr S-Bahn S28 Kaarster See - Neuss - Düsseldorf - Mettmann Stadtwald

References

External links
Deutsche Bahn website
Regiobahn website
The station in 1990

Railway stations in North Rhine-Westphalia